Jae-jin, also spelled Jai-jin, is a Korean masculine given name. The meaning differs based on the hanja used to write each syllable of the name. There are 20 hanja with the reading "jae" and 48 hanja with the reading "jin" on the South Korean government's official list of hanja which may be registered for use in given names.

People with this name include:

 Cho Jae-jin (born 1981), South Korean football player
 Lee Jae-jin (badminton) (born 1983), South Korean badminton player
 Lee Jai-jin (musician, born 1979), South Korean musician, member of Sechs Kies
 Lee Jae-jin (musician, born 1991), South Korean musician, member of F.T. Island

See also
List of Korean given names

References

Korean masculine given names